Cru or CRU may refer to:

 The constellation Crux
 Cru (wine), term for a vineyard

Institutions
 Civil Resettlement Unit,  for repatriated WWII  British POWs
 Climatic Research Unit, University of East Anglia, UK

Music
 Cru (group), an American hip hop group
 Cru (album), an album by Seu Jorge
 CRU (EP), an EP by Gnarwolves

Organizations
 Amsterdam Crusaders, an American football team in the Netherlands
 CRU Group, a business intelligence company
 Cru (Christian organization)
 The Crusader Union of Australia
 Commission for Regulation of Utilities, Ireland